Sonia canadana, the Canadian sonium, is a species of tortricid moth in the family Tortricidae.

The MONA or Hodges number for Sonia canadana is 3219.

References

Further reading

External links

 

Eucosmini
Moths described in 1925